The School of the Nations is a Baháʼí-inspired school located in Taipa, Macau.

It is owned by the Badi Foundation. In 1988, as the result of the efforts of a number of Macau residents and the Government of Macau, the School was established. As an international school, it provides an internationally oriented English and Chinese educational program for both expatriate and local families. The school currently has approximately 600-700 pupils, of whom about 70% are from Macau while the remaining 30% represent approximately 35 different nationalities. The parents of these expatriate students, for the most part, are in Macau for employment, working in Macau's private and public sectors.

History
The School of the Nations is an internationally oriented educational institution, licensed by the Government of Macau, as a non-profit organization. It originally opened in 1988 with 5 students, all of whom were enrolled in kindergarten. It came about as a result of efforts from a number of Macau residents who saw the need in the community for an English medium school. By the end of the 1989-1990 school year, the original premises in the Seng Vo building were filled to capacity. The demand for new enrollments however, continued to rise. It was decided to acquire additional property on the fourth floor of the Lei San building as an interim measure while a more permanent solution was sought. These premises were occupied for the school year 1990-1991 allowing the school to enroll approximately 200 students (a 100% increase over the preceding year). A 35% increase for the academic year 1991-1992 and a 29% increase for the 1992-1993 school year brought the school to a critical condition of overcrowding. To accommodate the influx of new students, in 1994 the school began to lease commercial properties and convert them to classrooms.

In 1997 all of Asia experienced a severe economic downturn, and enrollment to the school dropped. The decision was made to return all leased property, reduce overhead and limit enrollments to the number of students that could be accommodated in the properties belonging to the school. From that period until 2008, the school maintained a steady population of about 260 students.

In 2008, construction of the School of the Nations building was completed.  The building is located on Rua de Minho, on Taipa Island, not far from the Nova City residential complex.  This new facility has greatly increased the school's capacity, allowing for a major increase in student capacity. Since then, the school has grown to approximately 600 students with around 100 staff.

Facilities
As a result of Macau's limited amount of land, the school was initially located in rented properties within residential buildings. Normal classes were held in modified apartments.  Physical education and other outdoor activities were carried out in the nearby facilities of a government school as well as public facilities where the School had access to basketball and mini-soccer courts and swimming pools, while space in the Macau Cultural Center was used for school gatherings.

The present school building is located on these grounds.

The current school campus spans 7 floors. The ground floor is home to the school's library and some kindergarten classrooms, while the 1st floor is home to the cafeteria and more kindergarten classrooms. The 2nd floor consists entirely of primary school classrooms. The 3rd floor consists of middle school classrooms, one science laboratory, and the school's arts wing (two art classrooms, a drama studio, and a music classroom). The 4th floor consists of secondary school classrooms, an upperclassmen lounge, two science laboratories, as well as the school auditorium. The 5th floor houses the school's gymnasium, while the 6th and 7th floors (Roof and Upper Roof) are outdoor activity areas used for sports and recreational activities.

Curriculum
Character development, the development of the spirit of social service and cooperation as well as environmental awareness, is a strong theme in the educational program of SON. Despite retaining a 2-section naming system ("Primary" and "Form" a.k.a. Secondary) the school uses a 3-section system to divide its grades internally - primary school, middle school and high school. This is in order to cater to the different needs of students in each grade better.

The school's current standard curriculum for the lower grades (Primary 1 up to Form 2 a.k.a. Grade 8) consists of:
English
Mandarin
English Literature
History
Computer Science
Geography
Combined Science (integrating Biology, Chemistry and Physics)
Mathematics
Physical Education
Art
Drama
The character training program was awarded first prize in 1997 for innovation in curriculum by the Department of Education and Youth Services of Macau. It was also awarded 3rd prize by the International Schools Services in their worldwide competition for community service programs.

IGCSE Program
The International General Certificate of Secondary Education (IGCSE) is an English language curriculum offered to secondary students to prepare them for the International Baccalaureate, A Level and BTEC Level 3 curriculums. It is based on the older GCE O-Level and is recognized internationally as being equivalent to the British GCSE. Students begin studying for the IGCSEs in Form 3 (Grade 9) and generally take the examinations at the end of the school year in Form 4 (Grade 10); however, high-achieving students in the English and Mathematics courses are permitted to take the examinations in said courses one year early (at the end of Form 3/Grade 9). School of the Nations currently offers courses in the following subjects for the IGCSE Exams:
Biology (0610)
Physics (0625)
Chemistry (0620)
English - First Language (0522)
English - Literature (0486)
First Language Chinese (0509)
Computer Science (0478)
Mathematics (0580)
Additional Mathematics (0606)
Global Perspectives (0457)
Drama (0411)
Art (0400)
Music (0410)

The School of the Nations is currently the only school to offer the Drama IGCSE course in Macau. When starting the IGCSE program in Form 3, students choose to study either Art, Music, or Drama as their arts subject; in Form 4, they make a further choice on whether to continue to study and sit the exam for their chosen arts subject or study/take exams for Global Perspectives instead. The average grade achieved by a secondary student studying in the IGCSE program in SON is an A; most students achieve several A/A* grades.

I.B. Diploma Program
The International Baccalaureate Diploma Programme (IBDP) is a two-year educational programme primarily aimed at students aged 16–19. It is taken by all students starting from Form 5 (Grade 11) and ending in Form 6 (Grade 12) with the examinations. The program provides an internationally accepted qualification for entry into higher education and is recognised worldwide. The School of the Nations is currently one of only two schools in Macau to offer the IB Diploma Program as a part of its curriculum (the other being The International School of Macau). The School of the Nations offers the following subjects for the IB Diploma Program (further subjects are also available for online study through Pamoja; those are not included in the list below):

Group 1 - Studies in Language and Literature
English Language & Literature HL/SL
Group 2 - Language Acquisition
Chinese B HL/SL
Mandarin Ab Initio SL
Group 3 - Individuals and Societies
Business & Management HL/SL
Psychology HL/SL
Group 4 - Experimental Sciences
Chemistry HL/SL
Biology HL/SL
Physics HL/SL
Group 5 - Mathematics
Mathematics HL/SL
Mathematics Studies SL
Group 6 - The Arts
Visual Arts HL/SL
Music HL/SL

Students in the IBDP also have to write an Extended Essay not longer than 4000 words in a subject of their choice and complete CAS (Creativity, Activity, Service) experiences as a part of the program.

Scholarships

The school offers a scholarship to students who are in financial need and who have consistently and diligently demonstrated high academic merit.  Scholarship recipients must also be noted for their cooperative behaviour, friendliness, helpfulness, respect for teachers and fellow students, and obedience to school rules. The scholarship is funded through ongoing fundraising efforts within the school.

References

External links

Official Webpage 
Official Webpage 

1988 establishments in Macau
Bahá'í educational institutions
International schools in Macau
Cambridge schools in Macau
Educational institutions established in 1988
International Baccalaureate schools